Jamiatul Atiq Mosque, also locally known as Fourah Bay Mosque, is a large mosque located in the neighborhood of Fourah Bay, in Freetown,  Sierra Leone. The mosque regularly holds Islamic prayer services five times a day; and its also teaches Islamic education. The chief Imam of the Jamiatul Atiq Masjid is Chief Sheikh Alhaji Hassan Karim, and the deputy chief Imam is Sheikh Alhaji Nazir King.

The mosque is the main mosque that serves the Fourah Bay community, a predominantly conservative Muslim community in Freetown.

The then Minister of Social Welfare, Gender and Children's affairs, Sylvia Blyden, who is a Christian, joined Muslims in prayers at the mosque in celebrating of the 2017 Eid al-Fitr.

See also
 Islam in Sierra Leone

References

Buildings and structures in Freetown
Mosques in Sierra Leone